Melaleuca marginata is a shrub in the myrtle family, Myrtaceae and is endemic to the south-west of Western Australia. It is distinguished by its prickly leaves and its flowers occurring in long sections of the branches. From 1922 to 2011 was known as Melaleuca coronicarpa.

Description

The stamens are arranged in five bundles around the flower, each bundle containing between 10 and 22 stamens. Flowering occurs mainly in early spring and is followed by fruit which are woody capsules, with the sepals remaining as five teeth on each cup-shaped fruit.

Taxonomy and naming
Melaleuca coronicarpa was described in 1922 by Desmond Herbert however, a specimen formally described in 1845 by Otto Wilhelm Sonder as Astroloma marginatum was recognised in 2011 as the same species as the one named by Herbert. The type specimen described by Herbert was also found to be within the range of Melaleuca coronicarpa. Since the Sonder description had priority, it was renamed by Michael Hislop, Brendan Lepschi and Lyndley Craven. The name for this species is therefore now Melaleuca marginata. The specific epithet (marginata) is a Latin word meaning "border" or "margin" and refers to the distinctive leaf margin.

Distribution and habitat
Melaleuca marginata occurs from the Chapman Valley district south to the Ongerup district and east toward the Koorda and Grass Patch districts in the Avon Wheatbelt, Coolgardie, Esperance Plains, Geraldton Sandplains, Jarrah Forest and Mallee biogeographic regions. It grows in sand including lateritic sand, loam and clay, on sandy ridges, eroded laterite and undulating plains.

Conservation
Melaleuca marginata is listed as "not threatened" by the Government of Western Australia Department of Parks and Wildlife.

References

marginata
Myrtales of Australia
Plants described in 1845
Endemic flora of Western Australia